"No Arms Can Ever Hold You" (also known as "No Other Arms") is a song popularized in 1955 by Pat Boone and Georgie Shaw, who both charted in the United States with their renditions.

In 1964, it was a UK top 10 hit for the Bachelors.

Charts 
The Bachelors version

References 

1955 songs
1955 singles
1964 singles
Pat Boone songs
Georgie Shaw songs
The Bachelors songs